Arlington Station (formerly, Arlington) is a former unincorporated community, now annexed to Riverside in Riverside County, California. It lies at an elevation of 817 feet (249 m).

References

Neighborhoods in Riverside, California